All Star Baseball 2004 is a baseball video game developed by Acclaim Studios Austin and Acclaim Studios Manchester and published by Acclaim Entertainment in 2003. It features Derek Jeter on the cover.

Reception

The GameCube and PlayStation 2 versions received "generally favorable reviews", while the Game Boy Advance and Xbox versions received "average" reviews, according to the review aggregation website Metacritic.

References

External links
 

2003 video games
Baseball video games
Game Boy Advance games
GameCube games
All-Star Baseball video games
PlayStation 2 games
Video games set in 2004
Xbox games
Acclaim Entertainment games
Games with GameCube-GBA connectivity
Video games developed in the United States